Garson is a surname. Notable people with the surname include:

Gerald Garson (1932–2016), American lawyer, former New York Supreme Court Justice and convicted felon
Greer Garson (1904–1996), British actress, won the Best Actress Oscar for Mrs. Miniver (1942)
Margaret Garson (1927–2020), Australian physician and cytogenetics researcher
Mary Garson, Australian biochemist and academic
Mary Garson (nun) (1921–2007), Scottish nun
Mike Garson (born 1945), American jazz pianist
Mort Garson (1924–2008), Canadian-born composer and arranger, electronic music pioneer
Scott Garson (born 1976), American college basketball coach 
Stuart Garson (1898–1977), Canadian politician, former Premier of Manitoba and federal cabinet minister
William Garson (1856–1911), Scottish-born Ontario and Manitoba businessman and political figure
Willie Garson (1964–2021), American character actor